Martin Achille Abena Biholong (born 14 June 1986) is a Cameroonian former professional footballer who played as a midfielder.

References

External links
 

1986 births
Living people
Cameroonian footballers
Cameroonian expatriate footballers
Association football midfielders
Slovak Super Liga players
Super League Greece players
Czech First League players
FC DAC 1904 Dunajská Streda players
Xanthi F.C. players
AC Sparta Prague players
FC Lokomotiv 1929 Sofia players
Selangor FA players
FK Čáslav players
Cameroonian expatriate sportspeople in Slovakia
Cameroonian expatriate sportspeople in Greece
Cameroonian expatriate sportspeople in the Czech Republic
Cameroonian expatriate sportspeople in France
Expatriate footballers in Slovakia
Expatriate footballers in Greece
Expatriate footballers in Iran
Expatriate footballers in France
Expatriate footballers in the Czech Republic
Loko Vltavín players